Several ships of the French Navy have borne the name Atalante:

 , a 40-gun ship, broken up in 1733.
 , a 32-gun ship, sunk in 1760.
 , was a French 32-gun frigate launched in 1768  captured in 1794. The Royal Navy took her into service as HMS Espion. She became a floating battery in 1798, then a troop transport in 1799; she was wrecked in 1799 on the Goodwin Sands. 
She was wrecked in 1807.
 , a 44-gun  frigate, wrecked in 1805.
 , a  frigate.
  (1869), an  wooden-hulled armored corvette condemned in 1887. She sank at Saigon shortly afterwards.
  (1915),  an  launched in 1915 and struck in 1933.
  (1930),  an  launched in 1930 and struck in 1946.

French Navy ship names